Stephen Joseph Zand (September 18, 1898 – 24 January 1963) was an aeronautical pioneer who worked at the Sperry Gyroscope Co. and was later Vice-President of Engineering at the Lord Corporation. He solved many of the early problems related to vibrations and sound. He won the Wright Brothers Medal in 1931 for a paper on how vibration affects on-board instruments.

Awards
Fellow, Royal Aeronautical Society
Fellow, Institute of Aeronautical Sciences (later AIAA)
Wright Brothers Medal, 1931
Medal for Merit from the U.S. President

References 

Fellows of the Royal Aeronautical Society
Medal for Merit recipients
1963 deaths
1898 births
Place of birth missing